Griffintown–Bernard-Landry is an under construction Réseau express métropolitain station in the borough of Le Sud-Ouest in Montreal, Quebec, Canada. It will be operated by CDPQ Infra and serve as a station on the South Shore branch of the REM. However, delays due to COVID-19 pandemic mean that the station will not open until the end of 2024 (when the REM is scheduled to begin full service).

Location

Proposed location on Peel Bassin
The station was initially tentatively named Bassin Peel station and was planned to be located on the Peel Basin of the Lachine Canal, near the site of the former Goose Village neighbourhood. There was speculation that the Peel Basin would serve as the future site for a baseball stadium serving as a home for a Major League Baseball team in Montreal. On February 12, 2019, the group seeking the return of an MLB team to Montreal, led by Stephen Bronfman, registered Pierre Boivin, the former president of the Montreal Canadiens, as a lobbyist to negotiate the sale of the Peel Basin to build a stadium. The land is currently under the control of the Canada Lands Company, a Federal Crown Corporation.

Relocation to Griffintown and naming controversy
In November 2019, Montreal Mayor Valérie Plante first expressed a desire to name the station after the late Premier of Quebec, Bernard Landry, due to his involvement as Quebec's Minister of Finance, in the redevelopment of the area adjacent to Griffintown and the western portion of Old Montreal as the Cité du Multimédia, a business cluster for Information Technology companies. This sparked a backlash from the city's Irish community.

On June 23, 2020, it was announced that the station would be located on the Central Station train viaduct facing Dalhousie Street, between William Street and Ottawa Street in Griffintown. It was also announced that the station would be named Griffintown–Bernard-Landry as a compromise but the name still proved controversial.

References

Railway stations in Montreal
Réseau express métropolitain railway stations
Le Sud-Ouest
Major League Baseball
Railway stations scheduled to open in 2023